Beg to Differ is the second studio album by American heavy metal band Prong, released in 1990 through Epic Records. The album includes one live track ("Third from the Sun", a Chrome cover) recorded at CBGB's in New York City in 1989. Brian "Pushead" Schroeder did the design and cover artwork for the album. Part of the song "Lost and Found" was used for commercial breaks of MTV's Headbangers Ball in the early 1990s.

Beg to Differ was the start of Prong's change in music direction, showcasing an experimentation with thrash and speed arrangements and hardcore influences inspired by the likes of Bad Brains and Suicidal Tendencies. The album also stands as one of the earliest examples of the then-emerging subgenre of groove metal, predating Pantera's Cowboys from Hell by four months; this fact was later acknowledged by Prong vocalist and guitarist Tommy Victor, who claimed, "[Beg to Differ] was the first groove metal record. It gets overlooked, but I don't know who came out with anything before that."

Reception

Beg to Differ has received mostly positive reviews. Eduardo Rivadavia of AllMusic wrote, "Prong's once diffuse, post-hardcore rumble solidifies into a tightly disciplined thrash metal attack on their first major label release, Beg to Differ. Also a more democratic affair than later efforts, the album finds guitarist Tommy Victor and bassist Mike Kirkland alternating lead vocals as well as writing credits. And drummer Ted Parsons is equally impressive, providing a thunderous rhythmic foundation of Neil Peart-like diversity and precision."

Adam McCann of Metal Digest referred to Beg to Differ as "the superb 1990 album", and wrote, "When it comes to heavy metal, Prong may just be one of the most underrated and overlooked bands ever. With Beg to Differ, Prong delivered riff after riff of not only thrash metal, but thrash with the uptempo pumping riffage of crossover thrash whilst also deliver the meat and potatoes offered from the then burgeoning groove metal scene with both Exhorder and Prong laying the foundations for what would come very, very soon with Pantera".

Track listing

Personnel
Tommy Victor – vocals, guitar
Mike Kirkland – bass
Ted Parsons – drums

Production
Produced by Prong (Mike Kirkland, Ted Parsons, Tommy Victor), Mark Dodson
Executive producer: Bob Feineigle 
Engineers: Mark Dodson, Steve McAllister
Assistant engineer: Jamie Locke
Mixing: Mark Dodson
Mastering: Greg Calbi, Roger Lomas

References

Prong (band) albums
1990 albums
Albums with cover art by Pushead
Albums produced by Mark Dodson
Epic Records albums